This is a list of the hottest exoplanets so far.

List

References 

hottest